Barbara Mujica may refer to:

 Bárbara Mujica (writer), American novelist, short story writer and critic
 Bárbara Mujica (1944–1990), Argentine actress